Nisswa is a city in Crow Wing County, Minnesota, United States. The population was 1,971 at the 2010 census.  Nisswa is part of the Brainerd Micropolitan Statistical Area, near Gull Lake.

History
Smiley Township was founded in 1900, but local resident Leon Lum convinced residents to rename it Nisswa, from the Ojibwe word "nessawae" (which means "in the middle" or "three"), when the town was incorporated as a village in 1908.  Nisswa became a municipality on December 4, 1946.  Nisswa has become a popular tourist destination due to its many unique stores, resorts, and lakes in proximity including Stonehouse Coffee, a coffee shop and cafe that roasts beans in the store, Adirondack Coffee, the first gourmet coffee shop in central Minnesota, The Chocolate Ox, an ice cream parlor and candy shop, and Zaiser's shoe store. The Paul Bunyan State Trail runs through Nisswa.

Geography

Surrounded by lakes, Nisswa is part of the Brainerd Lakes Area. Some of these are Nisswa Lake, Roy Lake, Gull Lake, Lake Hubert, Clark Lake, Round Lake, and North Long Lake.

Minnesota Highway 371 serves as a main route in the city. Others include County Roads 13, 18, 77, and 115.

Demographics

2010 census
As of the census of 2010, there were 1,971 people, 876 households, and 607 families living in the city. The racial makeup of the city was 97.7% White, 0.4% African American, 0.7% Native American, 0.6% Asian, 0.1% from other races, and 0.6% from two or more races. Hispanic or Latino of any race were 0.5% of the population.

There were 876 households, of which 22.1% had children under the age of 18 living with them, 61.8% were married couples living together, 5.1% had a female householder with no husband present, 2.4% had a male householder with no wife present, and 30.7% were non-families. 26.0% of all households were made up of individuals, and 12.4% had someone living alone who was 65 years of age or older. The average household size was 2.25 and the average family size was 2.69.

The median age in the city was 50.6 years. 18.2% of residents were under the age of 18; 5.6% were between the ages of 18 and 24; 17.2% were from 25 to 44; 34.7% were from 45 to 64; and 24.4% were 65 years of age or older. The gender makeup of the city was 49.6% male and 50.4% female.

2000 census
As of the census of 2000, there were 1,953 people, 819 households, and 577 families living in the city. The racial makeup of the city was 98.87% White, 0.26% African American, 0.10% Native American, 0.15% Asian, 0.10% Pacific Islander, 0.10% from other races, and 0.41% from two or more races. Hispanic or Latino of any race were 0.41% of the population.

There were 819 households, of which 25.5% had children under the age of 18 living with them, 63.0% were married couples living together, 4.3% had a female householder with no husband present, and 29.5% were non-families. 24.3% of all households were made up of individuals, and 10.9% had someone living alone who was 65 years of age or older. The average household size was 2.37 and the average family size was 2.81.

In the city, the population was spread out, with 22.2% under the age of 18, 4.7% from 18 to 24, 25.9% from 25 to 44, 29.4% from 45 to 64, and 17.8% who were 65 years of age or older. The median age was 43. For every 100 females, there were 102.8 males. For every 100 females age 18 and over, there were 100.3 males.

The median income for a household in the city was $48,306, and the median income for a family was $54,931. Males had a median income of $37,772 versus $29,412 for females. The per capita income for the city was $26,265. About 2.7% of families and 4.9% of the population were below the poverty line, including 6.5% of those under age 18 and 5.8% of those 65 or older.

Politics

Events
Run for the Lakes Marathon
The Run for the Lakes Marathon is a 26.2 mile footrace that typically takes place in April. The race weekend also hosts a half marathon, a 10K, and a 5K.

Education
Almost all of Nisswa's students are educated at Brainerd Public Schools. The rest attend Pequot Lakes Public Schools. The zoned high school for the Brainerd district is Brainerd High School while Pequot Lakes High School serves the Pequot Lakes district.

Notable people
 Adrianne Lenker, musician

References

External links
City of Nisswa, MN – Official Website
Nisswa Chamber of Commerce – Visitor Information site
Run for the Lakes Marathon 

Cities in Minnesota
Marathons in Minnesota
Cities in Crow Wing County, Minnesota
Brainerd, Minnesota micropolitan area